Ellis Shipp (born 14 August 1997) is a Welsh rugby union player and professional rugby player who plays for Newport Gwent Dragons regional team as a hooker having previously played for Cross Keys RFC and Bedwas RFC

References

External links 
Dragons profile

1997 births
Living people
Dragons RFC players
Rugby union hookers
Rugby union players from Abergavenny
Welsh rugby union players
Hartpury University R.F.C. players